Chloropteryx nordicaria is a species of emerald moth in the family Geometridae. It is found in Central America and North America.

The MONA or Hodges number for Chloropteryx nordicaria is 7076.

References

Further reading

External links

 

Hemitheini
Articles created by Qbugbot
Moths described in 1901